Pomponia is a genus of cicadas from Asia. A group of species previously placed in Pomponia, containing the largest cicada species found on earth,  have recently been moved to Megapomponia. However, the remaining species still form a very heterogeneous group and Duffels and Hayashi (2006) mentioned that several species should probably be transferred to genera like Terpnosia and Leptosemia.

Species
These 48 species belong to the genus Pomponia:

 Pomponia adusta (Walker, 1850)
 Pomponia backanensis Thai and Yang, 2009 c g 
 Pomponia brevialata Lee & Pham, 2015 c g
 Pomponia brevicaudata Lee, 2013 c g
 Pomponia bullata Schmidt, E., 1924 c g
 Pomponia bulu Zaidi & Azman, 2000 c g
 Pomponia cinctimanus (Walker, 1850) c g
 Pomponia cyanea Fraser, 1948
 Pomponia daklakensis Sanborn, 2009 c g
 Pomponia decem (Walker, 1857)
 Pomponia dolosa Boulard, 2001 c g
 Pomponia folei Fraser, 1948 c
 Pomponia fugax Boulard, 2013 c g
 Pomponia fusca Olivier, 1790 g
 Pomponia gemella Boulard, 2005 c g
 Pomponia gigantea Distant, 1897
 Pomponia graecina Distant, 1889
 Pomponia hieroglyphica Kato, 1938
 Pomponia kiushiuensis Kato, 1925
 Pomponia lactea (Distant, 1887)
 Pomponia langkawiensis Zaidi & Azman, 1999 c g
 Pomponia linearis (Walker, 1850, zh) c g
 Pomponia mickwanae Boulard, 2009 c g
 Pomponia minilinearis Boulard, 2013 c g
 Pomponia nasanensis Boulard, 2005 c g
 Pomponia noualhieri Boulard, 2005 c g
 Pomponia orientalis (Distant, 1912) c g
 Pomponia parafusca Kato, 1944
 Pomponia piceata Distant, 1905
 Pomponia picta (Walker, 1870)
 Pomponia polei Henry, 1931
 Pomponia ponderosa Lee, 2009 c g
 Pomponia pornnapaae Boulard, 2013 c g
 Pomponia promiscua Distant, 1887
 Pomponia quadrispinae Boulard, 2002 c g
 Pomponia rajah Moulton, 1923
 Pomponia ramifera (Walker, 1850) c g
 Pomponia secreta Hayashi, 1978 c g
 Pomponia siamensis China, 1925 c
 Pomponia similis Schmidt, 1924
 Pomponia solitaria Distant, 1888
 Pomponia subtilita Lee, 2009 c g
 Pomponia surya Distant, 1904
 Pomponia thalia (Walker, 1850)
 Pomponia urania (Walker, 1850) c g
 Pomponia yayeyamana Kato, 1933 c g
 Pomponia zakrii Zaidi & Azman, 1998 c g
 Pomponia zebra Bliven, 1964 c g
Data sources: i = ITIS, c = Catalogue of Life, g = GBIF, b = Bugguide.net

See also
 Pomponia

References

Insects of Asia
Taxa named by Carl Stål
Cicadini
Cicadidae genera